The 2020 season is Kashima Antlers's 28th consecutive season in the J1 League, the top flight of Japanese football, since the introduction of professional football in 1993. The club finished the 2019 J1 League in third place, securing a play-off spot in the 2020 AFC Champions League. In addition to these competitions, they also competed in the Emperor's Cup and J.League Cup.

Squad

Transfers

Arrivals

Departures

Competitions

J1 League

League table

Results summary

Results by matchday

Results

Emperor's Cup

J.League Cup

Group stage

AFC Champions League

Qualifying play-offs

Statistics

Scorers

Clean sheets

References 

Kashima Antlers
Kashima Antlers seasons